John Gorman (1884–1936) was an American film director. He was born in Boston in 1884 and died in 1936.

Gorman directed 13 films.

Partial filmography
 The Butterfly Girl (1921)
 Why Women Remarry (1923)
Home Sweet Home (1926)
The Prince of Broadway (1926)
Black Tears (1927)

External links

1884 births
1936 deaths
American film directors